Petar Malinov (born 29 January 1970) is a retired Bulgarian footballer and current assistant manager of Slivnishki geroi, having started the role in May 2010.

Born in Sofia, Malinov played club football in Bulgaria. He ended his career as a player-manager with FC Slivnishki Geroy (Slivnitsa).

References

1970 births
Living people
Bulgarian footballers
Association football forwards
FC Septemvri Sofia players
PFC Spartak Pleven players
PFC Belasitsa Petrich players
PFC Pirin Blagoevgrad players
SR Delémont players
First Professional Football League (Bulgaria) players
Expatriate footballers in Switzerland
Bulgarian football managers